In Canadian contract law, Contract A is a concept applied by Canadian courts regarding the fair and equal treatment of bidders in a contract tendering process. Essentially this concept formalizes previously applied precedents and strengthens the protection afforded to those who submit bids in the tendering process. The concept was introduced in 1981 by the Supreme Court of Canada, in R. v. Ron Engineering and Construction (Eastern) Ltd. The court found that a "duty of fairness" was owed to all bidders by an owner in a tendering process.

A Contract A, a "process contract", is formed between the owner (person, company or organization tendering the project) and each bidder when a "request for proposal" is responded to in the form of a compliant bid, sometimes also known as submission of price. The owner must deal fairly and equally with all bidders, and must not show any favouritism or prejudice towards any bidder(s). In essence, this concept boils down to the right of an individual to have equal opportunity to be successful with their bid for work. 

A breach of Contract A may occur if the owner (or an owner's officer or representative, see vicarious liability), provides information, changes specification during the tendering process to unfairly benefit a particular bidder, enters into closed negotiations with an individual bidder in an effort to obtain more desirable contract conditions, etc. The most common situation in which an owner is accused of having breached Contract A occurs when a bidder is selected who is not the lowest bidder. This contravenes established custom and practice, which would normally dictate that the lowest bid be awarded the subsequent contract to perform the work, Contract B, but is not normally a source of a breach if handled properly. The successful suits for breach typically occur if the lowest bidder has been excluded based on a stipulation not clearly outlined in the tender documents (such as preference for local bidders) or when the Privilege Clause employed by the owner to exclude a principle of custom and practice is judged by the courts to be too broadly worded to have any meaning.

See also 
 Call for bids
 Contract B
 Duty of fairness
 Request for Proposal
 Reverse auction

References 

Canadian business law
Personal selling